Joseph F. Orseno (born October 4, 1955 in Philadelphia) is an American Thoroughbred racehorse trainer. He began his career as a professional trainer in 1977 and in 1997 joined Frank Stronach's racing stables. In 2000, Orseno conditioned Red Bullet, an upset winner of the Preakness Stakes. He went on to win two Breeders' Cup races that fall: the Juvenile with Macho Uno and the Filly & Mare Turf with Perfect Sting.

In July 2002, Joe Orseno returned to running a public stable.

References

1955 births
Living people
American horse trainers
Sportspeople from Philadelphia